Rom Rubenovich Varshamov (Russian Ром Рубенович Варшамов; Born April 9, 1927, in Tbilisi; Died August 24, 1999, in Moscow) was a Soviet Armenian mathematician who worked in Coding theory, especially on error-correcting codes and Number theory.

Varshamov studied in Tbilisi with Arnold Walfisz (where he was Georgian students’ champion in the 100 metres), as well as in Tomsk. After that, he was a researcher in Moscow at the Steklov Institute of Mathematics with Ivan Matveyevich Vinogradov, especially on Number theory and Coding theory, and the Ministry of Radio Engineering (working in Cryptography). In 1957 he proved the Gilbert-Varshamov bound for linear codes (independently of Edgar Gilbert who proved the non-linear part). From 1968 he worked in Yerevan and was director of the Computer Centre (now  Institute for Informatics and Automation Problems) of the Academy of Sciences of the Armenian SSR. He was author and co-author of more than 25 scientific articles and also a member of the Armenian National Academy of Sciences.

Selected bibliography
 Varshamov, R. R.: Estimate of the number of signals in error correcting codes (Russian), Dokl. Akad. Nauk SSSR 117, 739–741, 1957 
(English Translation in I. F. Blake: Algebraic Coding Theory: History and Development, Dowden, Hutchinson & Ross, 1973, pp 68–71)
 Varshamov, R. R.: A class of codes for symmetric channels and a problem from the additive theory of numbers, IEEE Trans. Inf. Theory 19, 92–95, 1973
 Varshamov, R. R.: On a method in the theory of reducibility of polynomials over a finite field, Sov. Math., Dokl. 44, No.1, 194–199, 1992; translation from Dokl. Akad. Nauk SSSR 319, No.4, 787-791, 1991

References

External links
 Varshamov on mathnet.ru
 Article in Golos Armenii, April 10, 2007, electronic version No. 142 of 26.12.09

20th-century Armenian mathematicians
Mathematicians from Georgia (country)
Soviet mathematicians
1927 births
1999 deaths
Scientists from Tbilisi
Georgian people of Armenian descent
Soviet Armenians